The 14th Annual Tejano Music Awards were held on March 14, 1994, at the Alamodome in San Antonio, Texas. The Tejano Music Awards is an annual awards ceremony recognizing the accomplishments of Tejano music musicians from the prior year.

Award winners

Vocalists of The Year
Male Vocalist of The Year
Emilio Navaira
Female Vocalist of The Year
Selena

Vocal Duo Of the Year
Joe Lopez, Jimmy Gonzalez, Mazz

Albums of the Year
Orchestra: Selena Live! by Selena
Progressive: Southern Exposure by Emilio Navaira
Traditional: Unrivaled by Los Chamacos

Songs of The Year
Song of The Year
"La Charanga" by Fandango USA
Single of The Year
"La Charanga" by Fandango USA
Tejano Country Song of The Year
"I've Got A Never Ending Love" by Ram Herrera
Instrumental of the Year
"Posse Polkas" by David Lee Garza Y Los Musicales
Tejano Music Video of the Year
"Lucero De Mi Alma" by Emilio Navaira

Entertainers of the Year
Male Entertainer of The Year
Emilio Navaira
Female Entertainer of The Year
Selena

Most Promising Band of The Year
Estrella

Showband of The Year
David Lee Garza y Los Musicales

See also
Tejano Music Awards

References

External links
The Tejano Music Awards official website

Tejano Music Awards by year
Tejano Music Awards
Tejano Music Awards
Tejano Music Awards
Tejano Music Awards